Relationship between the Kingdom of Morocco and the State of Palestine has been historically deep, yet complicated. Morocco has a consulate in Gaza while Palestine has an embassy in Rabat.

History
Morocco and Palestine share a common Arab heritage, where the Arabs from Levant brought Arabic language and Islam to North Africa, bringing Islam and Arabian/Levantine culture to the native North African population. However, once the Arab Caliphates fell in 13th century due to Mongol conquest, histories of both countries diverged the same time: Morocco became the independent Arab-Berber Kingdom while Palestine would be exchanged between the Mamluks and the Persians, before finally annexed into the Ottoman territory for the next 400 years. The two later found themselves colonised by Spain, France, and Britain

Contemporary relations
When the European empires began to abandon their colonial possessions in the MENA after the World War II, with Britain leaving Palestine in 1947, news about the 1948 Arab–Israeli War and the defeat of the Arab armies to the Jewish force had culminated into the anti-Jewish riots in Oujda and Jerada in solidarity with their Palestinian brethren, when Morocco was still a Franco-Spanish protectorate. Once Morocco was declared independence in 1956, however, the policy of Morocco was eventually ruled by Hassan II, who is ill-remembered by the Palestinians. Hassan II, in particular, was best known for his invitation of Mossad and Shin Bet agents to spy on other Arab leaders at the Arab League's summit in Casablanca 1965 when these leaders were planning for a potential liberation of Palestine, resulting in the 1967 Six-Day War that ended in complete humiliation. The same year of the Arab League's summit in Casablanca, Mehdi Ben Barka, a Moroccan opposition politician and a pro-Palestinian sympathiser, disappeared in Paris in October 1965, thought to be murdered under the order of Hassan II. Hassan II attempted to reverse the course by sending troops to assist the Arab coalition in the Ramadan War in solidarity with Palestine.

Meanwhile, Palestinians have shown greater sympathy to Morocco's neighbour and arch-rival Algeria and her ally Sahrawi Arab Democratic Republic due to similar revolutionary ideology, which affected the relations with Morocco despite Moroccan population's general support for Palestinian cause. Early leaders of the Palestine Liberation Organization (PLO) such as George Habash (who later founded Popular Front for the Liberation of Palestine) and Nayef Hawatmeh encountered El-Ouali Mustapha Sayed and Brahim Ghali in 1970s, where he expressed support for Western Saharan struggle and Polisario against Morocco. The rift between Morocco and the Palestinian nationalists almost widened when Hassan II sought to make a separate peace with Israel by hosting President Shimon Peres in 1986, but the Moroccan King subsequently backtracked from the original plan. Following the end of Cold War, Morocco and Palestine entered two decades of relatively stable relations.

See also
Embassy of the State of Palestine, Rabat
Israel–Morocco relations
Palestine–Sahrawi Arab Democratic Republic relations

References

 
Palestine
Morocco